Walter Fasano (born 10 April 1970) is an Italian film editor. Best known for his collaborations with director Luca Guadagnino, he rose to prominence for his work on the universally-acclaimed film Call Me by Your Name (2017), for which he received many awards and nominations.

Filmography

Feature films
 Cambio di mano (1996)
 Romantico (1997)
 Blood Is Not Fresh Water (1997; documentary)
 Sorrisi asmatici, parte terza (1997)
 Satelliti (1997)
 The Protagonists (1999) – also first assistant director
 16 45 (1999)
 Vai bello (1999)
 A Deadly Compromise (2000)
 Santa Maradona (2001)
 500! (2001)
 Giorni (2001)
 Dérive Gallizio (2001; documentary)
 Mundo civilizado (2003; documentary)
 Past Perfect (2003)
 Now or Never (2003)
 The Card Player (2004)
 Roundtrip (2004)
 Melissa P. (2005)
 4-4-2 - Il gioco più bello del mondo (2006)
 The Mother of Tears (2007) – also screenwriter
 Hermano (2007)
 Il confine (2007; documentary)
 The Man Who Loves (2008)
 I Am Love (2009) – also screenwriter and writer for soundtrack (5 tracks)
 Unlikely Revolutionaries (2010)
 Ritratto di mio padre (2010; documentary)
 One Day More (2011)
 The Perfect Life (2011)
 Magnificent Presence (2012)
 Padroni di casa (2012)
 A Five Star Life (2013)
 Bertolucci on Bertolucci (2013; documentary) – also co-director
 L'arbitro (2013)
 Bota (2014)
 A Bigger Splash (2015) – also writer for soundtrack (1 track)
 Antonia. (2015)
 Me, Myself and Her (2015)
 La prima volta (di mia figlia) (2015)
 Call Me by Your Name (2017) – also music editor
 Never Here (2017)
 Suspiria (2018)
 Ovunque proteggimi (2018)
 Respiri (2018)
 5 is the Perfect Number (2019)

Television
 Do You Like Hitchcock? (2005; television film)
 Il vizio dell'amore (2006; TV series)

Short films
 L'ultimo uomo (1995)
 Assunta (1995) – also assistant director
 Nastassia (1996)
 Qui (1997)
 Senza piombo (1997)
 La tua lingua sul mio cuore (1999) – also assistant director
 L'uomo risacca (2000)
 Quando si chiudono gli occhi (2000)
 Amateurs 2 (2000)
 Blue Haven (2001)
 Delfinasia (2007)
 Unione europea (2007)
 Diarchia (2010)
 L'Ora (2011)
 La cosa in cima alle scale (2011)
 Destinée (2012)
 L'inganno (2013)
 Io non ti conosco (2013)
 A Rose Reborn (2014)
 The Millionaires (2016)
 Await (2016)
 Closing In (2017)
 The Staggering Girl (2019)

Awards and nominations
 2017: Nominated— Film Independent Spirit Awards: Best Editing - Call Me by Your Name

 2017: Silver Ribbon

References

External links

Italian film editors
Living people
David di Donatello winners
1970 births
Nastro d'Argento winners